Bernhard Ebner (born 12 September 1990 in Schongau) is a German professional ice hockey player. He currently plays for Düsseldorfer EG in the Deutsche Eishockey Liga (German Ice Hockey League).

Ebner has also played internationally for the German national team. He represented Germany at the 2018 IIHF World Championship.

References

External links
 

1990 births
Living people
Düsseldorfer EG players
German ice hockey defencemen
Sportspeople from Upper Bavaria
People from Weilheim-Schongau